The 1977 Men's Junior World Handball Championship was the first edition of the IHF Men's Junior World Championship, held in Sweden from 11 to 19 April 1977.

Preliminary round

Group A

Group B

Group C

Group D

Group E

Group F

Group G

Group H

Main round

17th–21st place classification

Group V

Group VI

9–16th place classification

Group III

Group IV

1st–8th place classification

Group I

Group II

Placement games

19th place game

17th place game

15th place game

13th place game

Eleventh place game

Ninth place game

Seventh place game

Fifth place game

Third place game

Final

Final ranking

External links
IHF report
Results on todor66.com

1977 Junior
Men's Junior World Handball Championship
International handball competitions hosted by Sweden
Men's Junior World Handball Championship
Men's Junior World Handball Championship